The 1998 United States House of Representatives election in Vermont was held on Tuesday, November 3, 1998 to elect the U.S. representative from the state's at-large congressional district. The election coincided with the elections of other federal and state offices, including an election to the U.S. Senate.

Republican primary

Candidates
Mark Candon, investment advisor and former state representative
Peter Diamondstone, perennial candidate and socialist activist
Jack Long, lawyer and Democratic nominee for VT-AL in 1996

Results
Candon won the primary against Long by a comfortable 16-point margin. His victory came of the back of a very strong result in Rutland County, where he received over 90% of the vote, while also keeping Long's margin of victory in Chittenden County down to 15%. Diamondstone's effect on the primary was disputed; Long believed that Diamondstone had drawn voters from his campaign while Candon stated that he did not believe Diamondstone had a notable effect on the results.

Democratic primary

General election

Endorsements

Results

References

1998
Vermont
1998 Vermont elections
Bernie Sanders